MyRegistry.com is a universal gift registry service. The company also offers its gift registry software as a service (SaaS) to businesses of all sizes.

History 
MyRegistry.com operates through its website, browser plug-ins, and apps to serve as a third-party organizer alongside other online gift registry services for weddings, baby showers, birthdays, and other gift-giving occasions. MyRegistry.com was notably used by Princess Madeleine, Duchess of Hälsingland and Gästrikland ahead of her 2013 wedding.
MyRegistry.com also enables potential gift-givers to donate cash via PayPal rather than a physical gift.  Cash Gift Funds can be created for "honeymoon funds." This function has received mixed reviews as it can be perceived to be crass commercialism counter to traditional western norms of wedding etiquette, despite having some utility to newlywed couples. Although not addressing MyRegistry.com specifically, the Emily Post Institute and others have decried both giving cash as a wedding gift and expanding gift registry beyond weddings to other occasions such as college graduation.
MyRegistry.com has gained notoriety in part due to their interoperability with Pinterest. Shopko joined with www.MyRegistry.com to offer a universal gift registry to its customers. The registry was available in Shopko and Shopko Hometown stores and to online shoppers prior to the company's closure in 2019. Costco has teamed up with MyRegistry.com to offer registry services for engaged couples and expectant parents as well as other universal gift registries. MyRegistry.com is also available in Spanish, making MyRegistry the only end-to-end Spanish language Universal Gift Registry, with every feature for every gift-giving occasion accessible to the Spanish-speaking community.

References 

2005 establishments in New Jersey
Companies based in New Jersey
Internet properties established in 2005